Paropakari is a 1970 Indian Kannada language romantic drama film written and directed by Y. R. Swamy. It stars Rajkumar and Jayanthi. It revolves around the story of a self respecting young man who wins a wager with his wealthy father.  The film was produced under Bhagavathi Productions. It had a very successful soundtrack composed by Upendra Kumar.

Rajkumar plays a dual role in the movie. However, this movie is not considered as a movie with double role since the second character appears only for thirty seconds on-screen in spite of it being an important plot twist.

Mohan, played by Dr Rajkumar, leaves his father's home after betting that he would return home after one year, after earning Rs 25,000 by legal means. He meets Shami, played by Jayanti, a runaway orphan, on the way. The two start living together, but face several hurdles like Mohan being accused of a murder. He earns the money, only to decide to spend it on the cancer treatment of his teacher. Mohan survives an attempt on his life by his cousin. Mohan returns to his father, along with Shami in the end.

Cast 
 Rajkumar as Mohan / Ramanna
 Jayanthi as Shami
 Rathna
 Sampath as Veeranna, Mohan's father
 H. R. Shastry
 Pandari Bai as Mohan's mother
 Ganapathi Bhat
 Papamma as Ramanna's mother
 Vijayalalitha
 Nagappa as Jayanna
 G. V. Swarnamma
 Comedian Guggu
 Tiger Prabhakar
 Sundarashree

Soundtrack 
The music of the film was composed by Upendra Kumar and lyrics for the soundtrack written by Chi. Udaya Shankar and R. N. Jayagopal. All the songs were received very well and the cabaret track "Jokey Naanu Balliya Minchu" sung by L. R. Eswari created a rage and became a chart buster song. The song was recreated by Ravi Basrur in ''K.G.F: Chapter 1.

Track list

See also
 Kannada films of 1970

References

External links 
 

1970 films
1970s Kannada-language films
Indian black-and-white films
Indian drama films
Films directed by Y. R. Swamy